Caterina Guzzanti (born 5 June 1976) is an Italian satirist and actress. She is best known for her role in the celebrated television series "Boris".

Biography
She is the daughter of former Member of Parliament Paolo Guzzanti, and the sister of Sabina and Corrado Guzzanti, both also skilled satirists and occasional collaborators.

Career
She debuted in 1997 in the Pippo Chennedy Show, created and hosted by her brother Corrado Guzzanti.

From 2007 to 2010, she starred in the three seasons of the TV series Boris.

In 2012, she participated in the program Un due tre stella, hosted by her sister Sabina Guzzanti, where she played for the first time the character of Vichi, a parody of a militant girl of the far-right movement CasaPound.

In November 2013, she came back to work with Stefano Bollani in the final episode of the second season of the TV show Sostiene Bollani, on the Sunday late night on RAI 3. Since March 2013, she led the MT show La prova dell'otto. In 2021, she participated as a competitor in the Italian comedy show LOL - Chi ride è fuori.

References 

1976 births
Living people
Italian television presenters
Actresses from Rome
Italian women television presenters